White Bear railway station, on Station Road, Adlington, Lancashire, England, was on the Lancashire Union Railway line between St Helens and Blackburn. The station was named in some timetables as White Bear (Adlington) or White Bear for Adlington.

The station opened on 1 December 1869 one month after the line that it was situated on, the Lancashire Union Railway from Boars Head Junction in Standish to Rawlinson Bridge, opened for goods traffic. Passenger services also opened on the same date at Boars Head Junction and at Red Rock.

The joint line was constructed because the Wigan coal owners wanted better transportation links to the mills and factories of East Lancashire. The coal owners also wanted a line that would allow trains to go south and gain direct access to Garston Dock where shipping charges were far less than Liverpool dock.

The station was closed to passengers on 4 January 1960, but the line was used for freight and diversions until 1971.

Adlington railway station, serving the Manchester to Preston Line, is now the sole station in the village.

The tracks have been lifted and the station site has been completely built over.

References

Sources

External links
 Station history Adlington town website
 Station history Subterranea Britannica
 The station and nearby lines Rail Map Online
 Adlington's stations on navigable old OS maps, with current satellite overlay National Library of Scotland
 Adlington's stations on navigable late 1940s OS Map npe Maps
 The station, line and mileages Railway Codes
 The station from the air in 1950 Britain from Above (free login needed to zoom)

Disused railway stations in Chorley
Former Lancashire Union Railway stations
Railway stations in Great Britain opened in 1869
Railway stations in Great Britain closed in 1960
1869 establishments in England
1960 disestablishments in England